The European Diplomatic Academy is a diplomatic training programme launched by the European External Action Service in 2022 with the goal of building a fully-fledged European Union diplomatic corps that can promote EU foreign policy and external interests. It is run by the College of Europe.

Currently in its pilot programme stage, from September 2022 until May 2023, its participants are trained on EU foreign and security policies with practical and theoretical training modules. At the start of the programme, a two-week study trip to the EU's Eastern border provides first-hand contact with the reality of a security and refugee crisis through visits to Frontex, UNHCR, the Polish Ministry of Foreign Affairs, and visits to the border with Ukraine and Belarus. A first group of 42 young diplomats was selected and sent from the EU member states, Ukraine, Georgia, Moldova, Turkey, the Western Balkans countries and EU institutions to participate in the project. The first Director of the Academy, with the overall responsibility for the design of the programme, is Federica Mogherini, Rector of the College of Europe.

The European Institute of Public Administration, the European University Institute, and the Centre for European Policy Studies are running a feasibility study for the establishment of a permanent European Diplomatic Academy.

References

College of Europe
Diplomatic training
European External Action Service
2022 establishments in Belgium